Arabian Nights is a two-part 2000 American/British miniseries, adapted by Peter Barnes (his last film) from Sir Richard Francis Burton's translation of the medieval epic One Thousand and One Nights. Mili Avital and Dougray Scott star as Scheherazade and Shahryar respectively. Produced by Dyson Lovell and directed by Steve Barron, the serial was made by Hallmark Entertainment and originally broadcast over two nights on 30 April and 1 May 2000 on BBC One in the United Kingdom and ABC in the United States.

The series consists of five stories from One Thousand and One Nights, which are framed within a sixth, maintaining the traditional style of stories within stories that is synonymous with the Nights. The series cast includes Alan Bates, Rufus Sewell, Andy Serkis, James Frain, John Leguizamo (in a dual role), Jason Scott Lee, Vanessa-Mae, Alexei Sayle, Jim Carter, James Callis, and Oded Fehr.

Synopsis

Frame story
The series starts in Baghdad at an undetermined time (since the story teller seems to live during the late 8th century, but the stories that are told take place during the era of muskets, Englishmen, and Qing-era Chinese hairstyles & architecture, which means they take place from the late 17th century to the early 19th century). The Sultan of Baghdad, Shahryar (Dougray Scott), has gone mad having accidentally killed his treacherous wife five years earlier during a failed coup d'état, which his wife had planned with her secret lover, Shahryar's brother, Schahzenan (James Frain). In his madness, Shahryar now believes that all women want to kill him, but the law states that the Sultan must be married again or the throne will be passed to his brother. Shahryar has therefore ordered his Grand Vizier, Ja'Far (Jim Carter), to bring him one of his concubines from the harem to marry and then have executed the next morning.

In order to prevent this, the Grand Vizier's clever daughter, Scheherazade (Mili Avital), decides to marry the Sultan herself; Scheherazade (a childhood friend of the Sultan who has secretly fallen in love with him since then) formulates a plan to prevent her execution, and at the same time cure the Sultan of his madness. With the help of some tutoring from a bazaar storyteller (Alan Bates), Scheherazade (an already-avid lover of stories and of the lessons they can teach) tells the Sultan a story every night, stopping at dawn with a cliffhanger, and then refusing to continue until dusk. Shahryar must therefore let Scheherazade live for another day in order to hear the rest of the story. Cunningly, Scheherazade has hidden a moral within every story, to help coax the Sultan out of his madness.

Meanwhile, Schahzenan (Shahryar's brother) learns about the Sultan's madness and that he is unable to execute his new wife. Perceiving this as weakness, Schahzenan decides to lead his army to Baghdad in an attempt to take the throne by force. However, by the time Schahzenan's army reaches the city, Scheherazade's plan has worked. As a result of her stories, Shahryar has overcome his madness and has fallen in love with Scheherazade. Using strategies inspired from elements from the stories, Shahryar is able to defeat his brother's army.

At the end of the battle, it is revealed that all that had been seen was a story itself, recounted by Scheherazade to her children. The series ends with Scheherazade promising to tell her children another story tomorrow night.

Scheherazade's stories

Ali Baba and the Forty Thieves
The first story told by Scheherazade is that of Ali Baba and the Forty Thieves. Ali Baba (Rufus Sewell) is a poor peasant from Damascus who finds a magical cave where the loot is stolen by the Forty Thieves, a tribe of murderous bandits that have plagued the kingdom. Using the magic words "Open Sesame!", Ali enters the cave and takes the treasure. When Ali tells his brother Cassim (Andy Serkis) about the cave, Cassim demands his own share and goes to the cave himself where he is discovered and killed by the leader of the Forty Thieves, the infamous Black Coda (Tchéky Karyo).

Ali Baba finds Cassim's body hung-up by the Forty Thieves as a warning to others. With the help of his newly hired servant, Morgiana (Amira Casar), Ali takes down the body and gives Cassim a lavish funeral. This alerts Black Coda and the Forty Thieves to the fact that Cassim was not alone in taking their treasure.

Black Coda discovers that Ali Baba and Morgiana are living in a lubricious estate in Damascus and devises a plan to kill all in the household. The Forty Thieves enter the city hidden in oil barrels which are placed outside Ali's estate where they wait for nightfall. Before they can strike, Morgiana discovers the barrels and rolls them down to the bottom of a hill where the dazed Forty Thieves are arrested (and later hanged) by the city guards, although Black Coda escapes.

To celebrate their victory, Ali Baba hosts a feast. Morgiana performs an exotic dance for Ali Baba during which she stabs one of the guests, killing him. She removes the man's false beard, revealing him to be Black Coda. Awed by her loyalty, Ali Baba marries Morgiana.

The Tale of the Poor Hunchback
To prevent Shahryar realizing she's starting a complete new story, Scheherazade begins her next tale by following on from the last, explaining that Faisal (Stanley Lebor) designed Morgiana's wedding attire and his wife, Safil (Jamila Massey), from Constantinople (or Istanbul given the architecture and being under Muslim rule), were at Ali Baba's wedding.

Back in Constantinople, the couple have dinner with Bac-Bac (Alexei Sayle), the Sultan's hunchbacked-jester, during which Bac-Bac chokes on a fishbone and dies. Worried about their reputation, Faisal and Safil leave the body on the doorstep of a Jewish physician, Ezra Ben Ezra (Leon Lissek).

Before Dr. Ezra can take a look at Bac-Bac, he trips over him in the dark and they both fall down his doorway stairs. After the fall, Ezra finds the dead body and assumes that he accidentally killed him. Recognizing Bac-Bac, they repeat the actions of Faisal and Safil by dropping the body down the chimney of their Chinese neighbor, Hi-Ching (Junix Inocian). Hi-Ching mistakenly believes that he is about to be robbed and attacks Bac-Bac with Kung Fu. Hi-Ching mistakenly believes that he killed Bac-Bac by hitting him so hard and (like the others) he fears for his welfare. So he carries the body to a dark alcove, where Englishman Jerome Gribben (Roger Hammond) is walking home in a drunken stupor. Bac-Bac's body falls onto Jerome, who believes he is being attacked. He repeatedly hits the body against a wall and calls the nearby guards. The guards recognize Bac-Bac and arrest Jerome for murder.

Jerome is put on trial and sentenced to death. Unable to bear the guilt, Hi-Ching, Ezra, and Faisal all confess that they had killed the poor hunchback. In the middle of all their arguments, the Sultan (Tony Osoba) comes and demands to know who killed his jester. The Sultan realizes Bac-Bac's death was an accident in any event and frees Jerome and the others, explaining that Bac-Bac would have been amused by the manner of his death.

Aladdin and the Magic Lamp
This story tells the classic tale of Aladdin (Jason Scott Lee), a Chinese thief living in the caliphate of Samarkand (actually, China). While fleeing authorities for pick-pocketing, he sees a carriage and blocks its path. The carriage windows open to reveal the beautiful Princess Zubaïda (Vanessa-Mae). The two see each other and fall in love.

While escaping, Aladdin meets a mysterious African traveler named Mustappa (Hugh Quarshie), who claims to have been a friend of Aladdin's father and is willing to pay him a high price to do a 'simple' task. Aladdin agrees and meets Mustappa at the entrance of the Cave of Wonders. Mustappa gives Aladdin a ring, and swears "by Hector's feathers", that Aladdin will not see his wedding day if he betrays Mustappa.

Aladdin enters the Cave and walks through a Terracotta Army until he finds the lamp. He races back to the entrance, where Mustappa asks Aladdin to give him the lamp before he helps him out. Aladdin refuses, believing Mustappa will take the lamp and leave him in the cave. Mustappa, enraged, closes the cave's entrance and abandons Aladdin, just as the Terracotta warriors come to life. In desperation, Aladdin rubs Mustappa's ring and summons the neurotic Genie of the Ring (John Leguizamo) who reluctantly frees Aladdin from the cave.

Back home with his mother, Aladdin wonders why Mustappa would want a worthless old oil lamp. Rubbing it frees the Lamp Genie (also John Leguizamo) an incredibly powerful and intimidating spirit who can grant Aladdin's wishes. Aladdin and his mother wish to become royalty and for a fortune which they use to buy their way into the Royal Court. Aladdin asks the Caliph for Princess Zubaïda's hand in marriage, but he is turned down as the Princess is betrothed to Gulnare, the oafish son of the Caliph's vizier.

Aladdin discovers that the Princess is in love with him and using the Lamp Genie, he is able to humiliate Zubaïda's betrothed on their wedding night to prevent the marriage from being consummated, by trapping the vizier's son in a foul-smelling privy, and then marry the Princess himself after her furious father annuls the marriage. In Africa, Mustappa realizes that Aladdin is alive and has married as his pet raven, Hector, loses all his feathers. Mustappa goes to Samarkand dressed as a merchant trading new lamps for old ones, prompting a servant in Aladdin's palace to give the magic lamp to the Mustappa. Once the lamp comes into Mustappa's possession, he wishes to undo all Aladdin's wealth. Using the Genie of the Ring, Aladdin challenges Mustappa to a fight to the death with their magic. Each Genie transforms into one beast after another, until the Ring Genie is trapped in a giant mousetrap. Although Mustappa appears to have won, Aladdin is still a thief and is able to pick-pocket Mustappa, taking the Lamp and thus stealing his victory. Reunited with his mother and Zubaïda, Aladdin grants both the Genies their freedom, though only the Genie of the Ring accepts the offer.

The Sultan and the Beggar
At the beginning of the story, Scheherazade explains that her next story is about Amin the Beggar (who looks exactly like Shahryar) and the mean-spirited Sultan Abraschild (who looks exactly like Shahryar's brother) who rules Cairo.

The story follows Amin, (Dougray Scott) a lonely drunkard beggar who meets the ruthless Sultan Haroun Abraschild (a play on the historical Caliph Harun al-Rashid), played by James Frain. Abraschild kidnaps the unconscious Amin and dresses him as the Sultan. Abraschild then orders his servants to pretend Amin is the Sultan, as he watches the events unfold from secret chambers behind the palace walls. When Amin wakes, he at first thinks he has lost his mind, but soon begins to enjoy being Sultan. He eventually takes the job much more seriously as well and makes beneficial adjustments to the taxes and the wages of his army, with the Grand Vizier and Commander of the army Abou Nouz (a play on Abu Nuwas, a courtier of Harun's successor Al-Amin) noting that Amin has gotten more done in a day, than the real Sultan has in years. Overhearing this, Harun becomes angered and puts sleeping powder in Amin's drink. Abraschild then throws him back into the streets as a beggar. When Amin awakes, he is traumatized and insists he is the Sultan, prompting the city guards to put him in an insane asylum.

Abraschild decides to repeat the joke and again drugs Amin and returns him to the palace dressed as Sultan. When Amin wakes and becomes hysterical, he hears the snickering of Abraschild from inside one of the secret chambers, he draws a sword and inadvertently stabs Abraschild, believing he is a demon. Seeing that Abraschild is dead and he has left no heir, the Sultan's advisers decide to prevent civil war by telling everyone that the real Sultan has gone on a pilgrimage to Mecca, and that Amin was chosen as the Sultan's successor, all the while continuing to tell Amin that he is the one and only Sultan Haroun Abraschild. Amin goes on to become a respected Sultan beloved by the court and his people.

At the end of the story, as his brother's army approaches Baghdad, Sultan Shahryar realizes he is in love with Scheherazade and has been cured of his madness, but Scheherazade feels Shahryar needs to hear one more story before he goes into battle.

The Three Princes
The last story told by Scheherazade is about the sons of the long-suffering Sultan of Yemen, Prince Ali (Alexis Conran), Prince Ahmed (James Callis), and Prince Hussain (Hari Dhillon). The three are each gifted fighters and fight each other over the smallest of matters. Both their parents believe that when the Sultan dies, the sons will fight each other for the throne and will destroy the kingdom. After causing chaos in the city by fighting over a Princess, their father challenges each of his sons to bring him what they believe is the most precious object in the world, giving them one year to complete their quest.

Ali heads north to a brazen kingdom, and finds a powerful telescope. Ahmed travels east to a mountain Buddhist monastery which possess a mystic apple (the Apple of Life), which when eaten can heal any wound or illness and earns it when he passes a secret test of character. The last brother, Hussain, travels west to the underground city of Petra. He wanders through the underground market looking for the most precious thing in the world, eventually finding a flying carpet.

The journeys of the brothers take up the given year, and all three meet at the Traveller's Rest. Ali's telescope reveals that their father is on his deathbed. The brothers race back to Yemen on Hussain's carpet to save their father with Ahmed's apple of life.

Scheherazade explains that as a result of their adventures, when the brothers eventually succeed their father, they rule the kingdom together in peace and harmony.

Cast
 Mili Avital as Scheherazade
 Dougray Scott as Shahryar and Amin the Beggar
 Alan Bates as The Storyteller
 James Frain as Schahzenan and Sultan Haroun Abraschild (character based on the historical Caliph Harun al-Rashid)
 Peter Guinness as The Chief Executioner
 Jason Scott Lee as Aladdin
 Pik-Sen Lim as Aladdin's Mother
 John Leguizamo as The Genie of the Lamp and The Genie of the Ring
 Vanessa-Mae as Princess Zubaïda
 Hugh Quarshie as Mustappa
 Jim Carter as Ja'Far
 Amira Casar as Morgiana
 Rufus Sewell as Ali Baba
 Tchéky Karyo as Black Coda
 Andy Serkis as Kasim
 Alexis Conran as Prince Ali 
 James Callis as Prince Ahmed
 Hari Dhillon as Prince Hussain
 Alexei Sayle as BacBac
 Oded Fehr as Robber #2

Filming

Locations
Arabian Nights was filmed on location in Turkey and Morocco and at Antalya Film Studios, Turkey.

Critical reception
Variety wrote "Lush, lavish and longer than necessary, ABC’s “Arabian Nights” is definitely an appealing spectacle but overly sluggish in too many places"; whereas TV Guide wrote "Gracefully directed and lavishly mounted, this delicious adaptation bears the earmarks of a sturdy classic."

Honors and awards

References

External links

 
 Arabian Nights at RHI Entertainment

2000 American television series debuts
2000 American television series endings
2000 British television series debuts
2000 British television series endings
2000s American television miniseries
2000s British television miniseries
2000s adventure films
Costume drama television series
Emmy Award-winning programs
Films set in the 8th century
Films set in the 17th century
Films set in Baghdad
Films set in Damascus
Films set in Istanbul
Films set in Yemen
Films set in Samarkand
Films shot in Turkey
Genies in television
Sonar Entertainment miniseries
Television shows based on fairy tales
Works based on One Thousand and One Nights
Films directed by Steve Barron
Epic television series
Films scored by Richard Harvey